50 Years – Don't Stop is a box set by British-American rock band Fleetwood Mac, released on 16 November 2018, marking 50 years since the band's formation. Consisting of three CDs, the set spans the history of the band from 1967 to 2013. It was also released as a 5-LP set and a condensed single CD version. Unlike its predecessor, 25 Years – The Chain (1992), this album does not feature any previously unreleased material. It does, however, mark the first time certain tracks have been remastered or released in a physical format, as is the case with "Sad Angel".

Other songs appear in their single edit form, like "Sands of Time" and "Heroes are Hard to Find". Up until the release of 50 Years, these mixes had been out of print for decades.

Background
50 Years – Don't Stop is Fleetwood Mac's first career-spanning collection. It features liner notes by veteran music writer David Wild. The Belfast Telegraph said of the album, "The 50-track compilation is the sound of a band pulling themselves apart, and putting themselves back together, over the course of half a century."

CD track listing

Standard one disc edition

Deluxe three-disc edition

Streaming track listing
The track listing on streaming services made multiple changes.  The track order discards the chronological order used in the deluxe 3CD, vinyl and digital editions.  Additionally, ten songs were replaced (*), including five from the Peter Green era, and two songs swapped the live version for its studio counterpart (**).  The ten songs excluded are listed below for reference.  

(*) Exclusive to streaming version
(**) Studio version; live version included on non-streaming releases

Vinyl track listing

Charts

Weekly charts

Year-end charts

Certifications

References

External links
 
 

2018 compilation albums
Fleetwood Mac compilation albums
Rhino Records compilation albums